The 1943-44 Bohemian-Moravian Hockey League season was the fifth and final season of the Bohemian-Moravian Hockey League. Six teams participated in the league, and LTC Prag won the championship.

Regular season

Promotion 

Semifinals:
 HC Stadion Prag – DSK Tábor 2:2 (re-play 4:1)
 SK Prostějov – DSK Třebíč 2:0

3rd place:
 DSK Tábor – DSK Třebíč 4:1

Final:
 SK Prostějov – HC Stadion Prag 1:0

SK Prostejov was promoted to the Bohemian-Moravian League for the 1944–45 season, which was not played. The team participated in the Czechoslovak Extraliga in the 1945–46 season.

External links
 Season on hockeyarchives.info

Bohemian-Moravian Hockey League seasons
Boh